Gauri Deshpande (11 February 1942 – 1 March 2003) was a novelist, short story writer, and poet from Maharashtra, India. She wrote in Marathi and English.

Biography
Deshpande was born in Pune to Irawati and Dinkar Dhondo Karve, youngest of three children. She is also the granddaughter of the social reformer Maharshi Dhondo Keshav Karve.

Her daughter Urmila Deshpande is also an author and published the novels Kashmir Blues, A Pack of Lies, and Equal to Angels; the short story collection, Slither: Carnal Prose, and edited Madhouse: True stories of the Inmates of Hostel 4.

Education
Deshpande finished her high school education at Ahilyadevi School in Pune. She then attended Fergusson College to receive an M.A in English Literature. She eventually received her PhD in English from Pune University.

Professional life
Deshpande taught at the Department of English at Fergusson College and later as a professor at the department of English at the then University of Pune.

Death
Deshpande died in Pune on 1 March 2003 due to complications arising as a result of alcohol abuse. She is survived by two daughters from her first husband, one daughter from her second husband, three grandsons and a granddaughter.

Works
Deshpande wrote in Marathi and English. Her works include fiction, non-fiction, short stories, articles and translations.

Marathi works
 Paus Ala Motha (1973)
 Ekek Pan Galawaya (1985) (fiction) 
 translated to Gujarati as Ekek aa khare pandadun in 1989 by Jayantilal Mehta 
 Teruo Te Ani Kahi Door Paryant (1985) (fiction)
  Ahe He Ase Ahe (1986)
 Niragathi Ani Chandrike Ga Sarike Ga (1987)(fiction)
 Dustar Ha Ghat Ani Thang (1989)(Marathi fiction)
 Mukkam (1992)(fiction)
 Vinchurniche Dhade (1996)(fiction)
 Goph (1999)(fiction)
 Utkhanan (2002)(fiction)
 She also translated the ten volumes of "Arabian Nights" written by Sir Richard Burton from English to Marathi. The volumes were published in 1976-77.

English works
 "Between Births" (1968)
 Lost love (1970)
 The Murder (Article)
 Beyond the Slaughterhouse (1972)(poems)
 The position of women in India (1973)(Pamphlet)
 An anthology of Indo-English poetry (1974)
 Small is beautiful (Article)
 That's the way it is (1982)(Article published in Journal of South Asian literature) 
 Collected Plays of Satish Alekar (1989) co-editor. Within the book, the story The Dread Departure was the english translation of the 1974 Marathi play Mahanirvan by Satish Alekar
 Right on, Sister! (1995)(Article co-authored with Vidyut Aklujkar published in Journal of South Asian literature)
--and Pine for What Is Not (1995)(translation of  Sunita Deshpande's Ahe Manohar Tari...)
The Lackadaisical Sweeper (1997) (short story collection)
 
 Diary of a decade of agony (translation of Avinash Dharmadhikari's Aswastha dashakachi diary)
 The female of the Species (a short poem)

Influence 

 In 1989, her book Ekek Pan Galawaya was translated to Gujarati as Ekek aa khare pandadun by Jayantilal Mehta 
 In 2010, her book Niragathi Ani Chandrike Ga Sarike Ga was translated to English as Deliverance: a Novella by Shashi Deshpande
 In 2018, her book Paus Ala Motha was adapted into the Marathi film Aamhi Doghi.

References

Marathi-language writers
2003 deaths
1942 births
Writers from Pune
Savitribai Phule Pune University alumni
Indian women short story writers
Indian women poets
Marathi people
20th-century Indian poets
20th-century short story writers
Poets from Maharashtra
Women writers from Maharashtra
20th-century Indian women writers